Henry Charles Grawemeyer (September 3, 1912 – December 8, 1993), industrialist, entrepreneur, astute investor and philanthropist, created the Grawemeyer Award at the University of Louisville in 1984.  An initial endowment of $9 million from the Grawemeyer Foundation funded the awards, which have drawn thousands of nominations from around the world.

Grawemeyer Hall on the campus of the University of Louisville is named in honor of his family.

References

Sources

External links
https://web.archive.org/web/20111005210738/http://grawemeyer.org/about/h-charles-grawemeyer-biography.html
http://www.ket.org/cgi-bin/fw_comment.exe/db/ket/dmps/Programs?do=topic&topicid=LOUL110093&id=LOUL
 

1912 births
1993 deaths
20th-century American businesspeople
Louisville Male High School alumni
20th-century American philanthropists